The women's shot put event at the 2007 Summer Universiade was held on 10 August.

Results

References
Results
Final results

Shot
2007 in women's athletics
2007